David A. Clemens is an American politician. He served as a Republican member for the 16th district of the North Dakota Senate.

Clemens attended at the North Dakota State University, where he earned his Bachelor of Science degree based on Industrial engineering. In 2016, he won the election for the 16th district of the North Dakota Senate. Clemens succeeded politician, Tyler Axness. He had 4,457 votes with 54.1 percent and his opponent Axness had 3,783 votes with 45.9 percent. Clemens assumed his office on December 1, 2016.

References 

Living people
Place of birth missing (living people)
Year of birth missing (living people)
Republican Party North Dakota state senators
21st-century American politicians
North Dakota State University alumni